Mah-i Mulk Khatun was a Seljuk princess, daughter of sultan Malik Shah, sister of sultan Mahmud I and the second wife of Abbasid caliph Al-Muqtadi.

Biography
Mah-i Mulk Khatun was one of Malik Shah's daughters, her mother was Terken Khatun, She married Abbasid Caliph al-Muqtadi in 1082.

In 1081, the caliph sent Fakhr ad-Dawla to Isfahan, laden with gifts and over 20,000 dinars, to negotiate marriage with Malik-Shah's daughter. Malik-Shah was grieving the death of his son Da'ud and did not take part in the negotiations; rather, Fakhr ad-Dawla went to Nizam al-Mulk. The two worked together this time; they went to the princess's mother, Turkan Khatun, to make their request. She was disinterested at first because the Ghaznavid ruler had made a better offer: 100,000 dinars. Arslan Khatun, who had been married to al-Qa'im, told her that a marriage with the caliph would be more prestigious, and that she should not be asking the caliph for more money. 

Eventually, Turkan Khatun agreed to the marriage, but with heavy conditions imposed on al-Muqtadi: in return for marrying the Seljuk princess, al-Muqtadi would pay 50,000 dinars plus an additional 100,000 dinars as mahr (bridal gift), give up his current wives and concubines, and agree to not have sexual relations with any other woman. This was an especially heavy significant burden on the Abbasid caliph, since the Abbasids had been tightly controlling their "reproductive politics", with all their heirs being born to umm walads and therefore unrelated to any rival dynasties. By agreeing to Turkan Khatun's terms, Fakhr ad-Dawla was putting al-Muqtadi at a severe disadvantage while also benefitting the Seljuks considerably.

Mah-i Mulk became al-Muqtadi's second wife, Her father gave his consent and the marriage contract was concluded. She arrived Baghdad in March 1087. The marriage was consummated in May, 1087. She gave birth to prince Ja'far on 31 January 1088. But then Al-Muqtadi began to avoid her and she asked permission to return home. She left Baghdad for Khurasan on 29 May 1089, accompanied by her son. Subsequently, news of her death reached Baghdad. Her ailing father, brought her son back to Baghdad in October 1092. Ja'far was taken back to the Caliphal palace, where he remained until his death on 21 June 1093. He was buried near the caliphal tombs in the Rusafah Cemetery.

See also
 Sifri Khatun
 Ismah Khatun

References

Sources
 El-Hibri, T. (2021). The Abbasid Caliphate: A History. Cambridge University Press.
 al-Sāʿī, Ibn; Toorawa, Shawkat M.; Bray, Julia (2017). كتاب جهات الأئمة الخلفاء من الحرائر والإماء المسمى نساء الخلفاء: Women and the Court of Baghdad. Library of Arabic Literature. NYU Press.
 Hanne, Eric (2008). "The Banu Jahir and Their Role in the Abbasid and Saljuq Administrations".

Seljuk dynasty
1089 deaths
11th-century Turkic people
Turkic female royalty
Wives of Abbasid caliphs

Year of birth unknown